Urbain de Maillé-Brézé (1597 – 13 February 1650), was a 17th-century French soldier and diplomat, who was a Marshal of France, Ambassador to Sweden in 1632, and Viceroy of Catalonia 1641 to 1642.

His marriage to the younger sister of Cardinal Richelieu, French chief minister from 1624 to 1642, brought success and enormous wealth. His son held a number of senior naval positions, and his daughter married Louis, Grand Condé. He lost office following Richelieu's death in December 1642, and spent the rest of his life on his estates in Milly-le-Meugon, where he died on 13 February 1650.

Life

Urbain de Maillé-Brézé was born in 1597, to Charles de Maillé, S (1568-1613), Seigneur de Brézé, and Jacqueline de Thévalle. His father was described as an 'écuyer', a level of gentry below the nobility; two years after his death in 1615, Jacqueline purchased the title of Marquis.

In 1617, he married Nicole du Plessis-Richelieu (1587-1635), younger sister of Cardinal Richelieu, French chief minister 1624 to 1642. They had two children, Jean Armand, (1619-1646), who became an admiral and succeeded his uncle as duc de Fronsac, and Claire-Clémence de Maillé-Brézé, (1628–1694), who married the Prince de Condé (1621-1686). Despite an enormous dowry, Condé deeply resented a forced marriage to someone he considered a social inferior.

Career
While his marriage guaranteed the recognition essential for a successful career, Maillé-Brézé was also a competent soldier. In 1620, he was appointed commander of Marie de' Medici's personal guard; during the 1622 to 1630 Huguenot rebellions, he was present at the sieges of La Rochelle and Saint-Martin-de-Ré.

During the 1628 to 1631 War of the Mantuan Succession, in March 1629, he was part of a famous action when the French stormed barricades blocking the Pas de Suse. By the end of the month, they had lifted the siege of Casale Monferrato and taken the strategic fortress of Pinerolo.

Maillé-Brézé fought in many battles. He participated in the Siege of La Rochelle (1627–1628). In 1635 he conquered Heidelberg and Speyer, together with Jacques-Nompar de Caumont, duc de la Force, at the head of the Army of Germany.

In 1635 he was put, together with Gaspard III de Coligny, at the head of the French army that invaded Flanders. They were victorious at the Battle of Les Avins against the Spanish, but the Siege of Leuven was a complete failure.

In 1641, together with duc de la Meilleraye, he conquered Lens in 3 days, Aire-sur-la-Lys (August) and Bapaume (September).

After these successes Maillé-Brézé was made Viceroy of newly conquered Catalonia. He attempted to drive the Spanish from Collioure, Perpignan and Sainte-Marie, but failed. In May 1642 he was replaced and retired from active duty to spend the rest of his life in his castle in Milly-le-Meugon.

His son was killed at Orbetello in June 1646, and buried in the local church, as was Maillé-Brézé, when he died on 13 February 1650.

References

Sources

External links
 Biographie (Site of professor Dénecheau)
  (Find A Grave) 

1598 births
1650 deaths
Marshals of France
Ambassadors of France to Sweden
Military personnel of the Franco-Spanish War (1635–1659)
French military personnel of the Thirty Years' War